Ryu Su-jeong (Hangul: 류수정, born November 19, 1997), known mononymously as Sujeong, is a South Korean singer and a member of South Korean girl group Lovelyz. She debuted as a solo artist with her first EP, Tiger Eyes, on May 20, 2020.

Following Lovelyz's contract come to end and went hiatus in November 2021, Ryu decides to not renew her contract with Woollim. She later established the independent label, House of Dreams on September 1, 2022.

Discography

Albums

Extended plays

Singles

Writing and production credits 
All credits are adapted from the Korea Music Copyright Association, unless stated otherwise.

Filmography

Reality Shows

References

1997 births
Living people
Woollim Entertainment artists
K-pop singers
South Korean female idols
South Korean women pop singers
21st-century South Korean singers
21st-century South Korean women singers
School of Performing Arts Seoul alumni
Lovelyz members